Jacobaea paludosa, syn. Senecio paludosus, the fen ragwort, is a species of the genus Jacobaea and the family Asteraceae that can be found in Northern Italy, and everywhere in Europe (except for Finland, Iceland, Ireland, Norway, Portugal and Russia).

References

External links

paludosa